is a 　mountain of Chūgoku Mountains, located on the border of Taka and Kamikawa, Hyōgo, Japan. This mountain is one of Hyōgo 50 mountains. This mountain is an important center of Kasagatayama-Sengamine Prefectural Natural Park.

Outline 
Mount Sen is the easternmost mountain, which is taller than 1000 m in Chugoku Mountains. Mount Sen is a typical fault-block mountain in this area.

On the name of Mount Sen, there are two explanations. One is because it has thousands of peaks (in Japanese ‘sen’ means thousand), however judging from the shape of the mountain, this explanation can not be believed. The other explanation is because the mountain is a mountain for Xian. In Japanese, Xian(仙) is pronounced ‘sen’.

Route 

There are three major routes to the top of this mountain. Mitani route and Iwazashin route start from Kadokura Bus Stop of Shinki Bus. It takes about two and half hours. The other route, Ichinara route is from Tanji Bus Stop, it takes about three hours.

Access 
 Kadokura Bus Stop of Shinki Bus
 Tanji Bus Stop of Shinnki Bus

Gallery

References
 Shinpan Furusato Hyogo 50 san
 Official Home Page of the Geographical Survey Institute in Japan

Sengamine